This is a list of the French SNEP Top 100 Singles number-ones of 1995.

Number-ones by week

Singles Chart

See also
1995 in music
List of number-one hits (France)
List of artists who reached number one on the French Singles Chart

References

1995 in French music
1995 record charts
Lists of number-one songs in France